Henri Curiel (13 September 1914 – 4 May 1978) was a left-wing political activist in Egypt and France. Born in Egypt, Curiel led the communist Democratic Movement for National Liberation until he was expelled from the country in 1950.

Settling in France, Curiel aided the Algerian Front de Libération Nationale and other national liberation causes, including in South Africa and Latin America. In 1978 Curiel was assassinated in Paris; his murderer has never been identified.

Biography

Early life and family
Curiel was born in Cairo to an Italian Sephardic family. He became an Egyptian citizen in 1935. His brother Raoul Curiel became a respected archaeologist and numismatist, specializing in Central Asian studies. A cousin was Eugenio Curiel, a physicist and anti-fascist militant who was murdered in Italy in 1945. Another cousin was the noted British KGB spy George Blake. In an interview with Jean Lesieur, published in the French magazine L'Express on Feb 21, 1991, the latter said that the older Curiel had been influential as a communist in shaping his political views, as Blake met him as a teenager.

His son is the French journalist Alain Gresh, who was born in Cairo in 1948 and grew up in Paris.

Political career in Egypt
In 1939 Curiel, his brother Raoul and Georges Henein launched Don Quichotte, a French language Communist weekly. In 1943 he founded the communist Egyptian Movement for National Liberation (HAMETU) which in 1947 became the Democratic Movement for National Liberation (HADETU). He was repeatedly arrested, along with many other communists. Despite his Egyptian citizenship, he was forced to emigrate in 1950.

The Democratic Movement for National Liberation was an active participant in the 1952 revolution led by the free officers and Gamal Abdel Nasser. The revolutionary council and the free officers had many members from HADETU; the most eminent of these were Khaled Mohy el din, Yousef Sedeek and Ahmed Hamroush. Curiel settled in France and led a circle of Jewish communist emigres from Egypt known as the "Rome Group".

Anti-colonial activism in Paris
Curiel worked for the Jeanson network which supported the Front de Libération Nationale (FLN) during the Algerian War (1954–62). He was arrested by the French security services in 1960. Curiel was a founder of "Solidarité", a support group for various anti-colonial and opposition movements in the Third World (in particular Africa and Latin America), such as the African National Congress (ANC).

In 1976 he initiated contacts with Israeli and Palestinian representatives willing to negotiate a mutual recognition. Several meetings, later known as the "Paris talks", were organized. 
Under the chairmanship of Pierre Mendès France, they included Issam Sartawi, adviser to Yasser Arafat; and Uri Avnery and Mattityahu Peled, members of the Israeli Council for Israeli-Palestinian Peace (ICIPP).

On 21 June 1976, Georges Suffert published an article in Le Point reporting Curiel as the "head of the terrorist support network", connected with the KGB. He was put under house arrest in Digne, an administrative measure that was lifted once the accusation was demonstrated to be untrue.

An American CIA report from 1981 (a Special National Intelligence Estimate) said that Curiel's organization "has provided support to a wide variety of Third World leftist revolutionary organizations", including "false documents, financial aid, and safehaven before and after operations, as well as some illegal training in France in weapons and explosives." The authors further comment that his group's "association with non-communist and nonviolent leaders, including clergymen, has tended to cloak the nature and extent of its operations."

Assassination

Henri Curiel was assassinated in Paris on 4 May 1978. Two far-right groups (OAS and the Charles Martel Group) claimed responsibility, but the case is still unsolved.

Police and journalistic investigations suggest other suspects: 
 Jean-Pierre Maïon, a French criminal linked to the SDECE and the OAS, who worked as an informant for Lucien Aimé-Blanc, may have killed Henri Curiel on behalf of a Spanish death squad 
 Abu Nidal group (it allegedly later shot Issam Sartawi), allegedly commissioned by the KGB
 South African Bureau of State Security (because of Curiel's aid to the ANC) 

Henri Curiel is buried at Père Lachaise Cemetery, Paris.

Curiel's work in promoting dialogue between the PLO and left-wing Israelis was continued throughout the 1980s by the Comité Palestine et Israël Vivront, headed by Sorbonne lecturer Joyce Blau –  Curiel's close associate and fellow Egyptian exile.

In fiction

Henri Curiel appears in several parts of the 1982 spy thriller Shadow of Shadows by Ted Allbeury, whose plot is focused on George Blake. Allbeury takes at face value the assertions of Curiel having been a KGB agent, and assumes that for some time in the 1950s Curiel was Blake's KGB contact – for which there is no historical proof of any kind.

See also 
List of assassinated people
Anti-colonialism
Wars of national liberation
Israeli–Palestinian conflict
Adolfo Kaminsky
Jeanson network

Notes

References
 Georges Suffert, "Le patron des réseaux d'aide aux terroristes", Le Point, 21 June 1976
 Roland Gaucher, Le Réseau Curiel ou la subversion humanitaire, Jean Picollec, 1981
 Jean-Marie Domenach, "Trois ans apres: L'affaire Curiel. 1. La preuve ne doit pas apparaitre". Le Monde, 16 mai 1981. 2." Espion et terroriste, certes pas". Le Monde, 17–18 mai 1981.
 Gilles Perrault, Un homme à part, Bernard Barrault, 1984
 Gilles Perrault, "Henri Curiel, citizen of the third world". Le Monde Diplomatique online, English edition, 1998/04/13, http://mondediplo.com/1998/04/13curiel
 Alain Gresh, The PLO: The Struggle Within: Towards an Independent Palestine, London: Zed Books, 1985
 Jacques Hassoun, "La vie passionnée d'Henri Curiel", Revue d'études palestiniennes, 1998
 Recherches Internationales, Crise et avenir de la solidarité internationale. "Hommage à Henri Curiel", n° 52–53, 1998
 Charles Enderlin, Paix ou guerres. Les secrets des négociations israélo–arabes 1917–1995, Stock, Paris, 2004
 Alexandre Adler at the AJOE Congress, 6 March 2006
 Lucien Aimé-Blanc, Jean-Michel Caradec'h, L'Indic et le Commissaire, Plon, 2006
 Jonathan C. Randal, "French Socialists Start Digging Into Overtones of Curiel Killing," International Herald Tribune, 24 August 1981

External links
 The Dispersion of Egyptian Jewry – Culture, Politics, and the Formation of a Modern Diaspora
 Inventory of the papers of the EGYPTIAN COMMUNISTS IN EXILE (ROME GROUP)
 Uri Avnery, "The silent idealist"] Le Monde diplomatique, April 1998
 BASE DE DONNEES SUR LES ACTES TERRORISTES
 "Blake, George" Spies Encyclopedia

1914 births
1978 deaths
Politicians from Cairo
Jewish socialists
Egyptian people of Italian-Jewish descent
Egyptian Sephardi Jews
French people of Egyptian-Jewish descent
French people of Italian-Jewish descent
French Sephardi Jews
Assassinated activists
Burials at Père Lachaise Cemetery
Assassinated Jews
Assassinated Egyptian journalists
Egyptian people murdered abroad
People murdered in Paris
Deaths by firearm in France
1978 murders in France
20th-century Egyptian writers
Egyptian magazine founders
Egyptian emigrants to France
1970s murders in Paris